Waldemar Tomaszewski (former spelling Valdemar Tomaševski, born 3 March 1965) is a Polish-Lithuanian politician who is also an activist for the Polish minority in Lithuania and Member of the European Parliament (MEP). Leader of the Electoral Action of Poles in Lithuania (LLRA), Tomaszewski has been an MEP since 2009.  He sits in the European Conservatives and Reformists group, of which he is a Member of the Bureau on the group executive.

Biography
First elected to Vilnius district council for Electoral Action in 1995, Tomaszewski was elected President of LLRaL in 1999.  He was first elected to the Seimas at the 2000 election, winning 51% of the vote in the single-seat constituency of Šalčininkai. In the same year, he became deputy mayor of Vilnius district, serving from 2000 to 2003.  Finding himself as one of only two LLRA members in the Seimas, during the parliamentary term, he moved between factions, including Homeland Union and Order and Justice.

Tomaszewski was re-elected to the Seimas in 2004 with 63% of the vote: one of five candidates in the country elected in the first round. He was re-elected again at the 2008 election, winning 61% of the vote: eight times his nearest competitor's share.  In the May 2009 presidential election, he became the first presidential candidate nominated by LLRA. Receiving 4.7% of the national vote, Tomaszewski finished fourth, with Dalia Grybauskaitė winning comfortably.

The following month, he stood for election to the European Parliament. Winning 8.4% of the vote, up from 5.7% in 2004, LLRA won its first ever MEP, with Tomaszewski topping the list and being elected. He joined the European Conservatives and Reformists, and was appointed to the group's bureau. He was reelected for next terms in 2014 and in 2019.

He has been awarded the Commander's Cross of the Order of Merit of the Republic of Poland.

See also
 Poles in Lithuania

Footnotes

External links
 
 Profile at European Parliament website

1965 births
Living people
Commanders of the Order of Merit of the Republic of Poland
Electoral Action of Poles in Lithuania – Christian Families Alliance MEPs
Lithuanian people of Polish descent
Members of the Seimas
MEPs for Lithuania 2009–2014
MEPs for Lithuania 2014–2019
MEPs for Lithuania 2019–2024
Politicians from Vilnius
Vilnius Gediminas Technical University alumni